Clinton County may refer to:
Counties named for George Clinton, first and third Governor of New York, and later the fourth Vice President of the United States:
Clinton County, New York
Clinton County, Ohio
Counties named for DeWitt Clinton, seventh and ninth Governor of New York and nephew of George Clinton:
Clinton County, Illinois
Clinton County, Indiana
Clinton County, Iowa
Clinton County, Kentucky
Clinton County, Michigan
Clinton County, Missouri
Clinton County, Pennsylvania

See also
Clinton County Courthouse (disambiguation)